= Appolena =

Town of ancient Phrygia

Coordinates: 38°57′34″N 31°08′52″E

Appolena was a town of ancient Phrygia, inhabited during Roman and Byzantine times. Its name does not occur in ancient authors, but is inferred from epigraphic and other evidence.

Its site is located near Tezkalesi in Anatolia.
